P21 road is a regional road (P-Highway) in Zakarpattia Oblast and Ivano-Frankivsk, Ukraine. It runs north-south and connects cities of Dolyna and Khust.

Main route

Main route and connections to/intersections with other highways in Ukraine.

See also

 Roads in Ukraine

References

External links
Regional Roads in Ukraine in Russian

Roads in Zakarpattia Oblast
Roads in Ivano-Frankivsk Oblast